Halophila engelmannii is a species of seagrass in the Hydrocharitaceae family. It is referred to by the common names star grass and Engelmann's seagrass and grows underwater on shallow sandy or muddy sea floors. It is native to the Bahamas, the Cayman Islands, Costa Rica, Cuba, the Gulf Coast of the United States, the Gulf Coast of Mexico, Puerto Rico, and Trinidad and Tobago.

Description
Halophila is the only genus of seagrass lacking basal sheaths on the leaf stems. Like other seagrasses, Halophila engelmannii has rhizomes that run along near the surface of sand or mud, with roots at the nodes to anchor them in place. Each leaf stem grows from a node and has a pair of scales halfway up and another pair at the base of the leaf blades. Each blade is oval, has 6 to 8 veins and a finely serrated margin.

Distribution
Halophila engelmannii is found on the coasts of Florida, Texas, the Bahamas, Cuba and the West Indies. It is one of three species of Halophila found in the Indian River Lagoon, Florida, the others being Halophila decipiens and Halophila johnsonii. They often form mixed seagrass meadows at greater depths than other seagrasses normally grow.

Biology
Flowering occurs in the early summer when the water temperature reaches at least 22 °C. Fragments of the plant that become detached are able to grow into new plants. The seagrass meadow acts as habitat and food source for many invertebrates and fish. In the Indian River Lagoon, animals that feed on Halophila engelmannii include sea turtles, sea urchins, parrotfish, surgeonfish and possibly pinfish. The sea slug Elysia serca preferentially feeds on it by sucking sap.

References

engelmannii
Flora of the Bahamas
Flora of the Cayman Islands
Flora of Costa Rica
Flora of Cuba
Flora of the United States
Flora of Mexico
Flora of Puerto Rico
Flora of Trinidad and Tobago
Taxa named by Paul Friedrich August Ascherson
Flora without expected TNC conservation status